Echoes of Valor III is an anthology of fantasy stories, edited by Karl Edward Wagner. It was first published in paperback by Tor Books in September 1991.

The book collects eight classic fantasy short stories by various authors, along with associated commentary.

Contents
"The Shadow of the Vulture" (Robert E. Howard)
"Cursed Be the City" (Henry Kuttner)
"The Citadel of Darkness" (Henry Kuttner)
"Hok Goes to Atlantis" (Manly Wade Wellman)
"Wolves of Darkness" (Jack Williamson)
"Nictzin Dyalhis: Mysterious Master of Fantasy" (Sam Moskowitz)
"The Red Witch" (Nictzin Dyalhis)
"The Sapphire Goddess" (AKA "The Sapphire Siren") (Nictzin Dyalhis)
"The Sea-Witch" (Nictzin Dyalhis)

References

1991 anthologies
Fantasy anthologies
Tor Books books